Zoğallıq is a village and municipality in the Ismailli Rayon of Azerbaijan. It has a population of 436.

References

Populated places in Ismayilli District